Sergei Pavlovich Filippov (24 July 1891 (NS)- July 1942) was an association football player. He was killed during World War II, a civilian casualty of the Siege of Leningrad.

Honours
 Russia Champion: 1912.

International career
Filippov made his debut for Russia on 30 June 1912 in the 1912 Olympics against Finland.

References

External links
  Profile

1892 births
1942 deaths
Russian footballers
Russia international footballers
Footballers at the 1912 Summer Olympics
Olympic footballers of Russia
Association football forwards
Victims of the Siege of Leningrad